Melani Olivares Mora (born 1973) is a Spanish actress. She is mainly known for her performance as Paz in the comedy television series Aída.

Biography 
She was born in Badalona in 1973. She had her television debut in 1993 as host in the Antena 3's youth show Leña al mono que es de goma. After training at the Cristina Rota's acting school, her acting career began in 1995 with a performance in La niña de tus sueños.

Among her extensive credits is Quédate, a short film for which she won the Best Actress award at VI Certamen Nacional de Cortos de Dos Hermanas.

Films
 La niña de tus sueños (1995)
 Me da igual (2000)
 No te fallaré (2001)
 Noche de reyes (2001)
 No dejaré que no me quieras (2002)
 Agujeros en el cielo (2004)
 Shevernatze un ángel corrupto (2007)
 8 citas (2008)
 Temporal (2013)
 Dos a la carta (2014)
 Crisis (2014)

References

External links

Actresses from Catalonia
1973 births
Living people
20th-century Spanish actresses
21st-century Spanish actresses
Spanish television actresses
Spanish film actresses
People from Badalona